Elohim Prandi (born 24 August 1998) is a French handball player for Paris Saint-Germain Handball and the French national team.

He represented France at the 2020 European Men's Handball Championship.

References

External links

1998 births
Living people
French male handball players
People from Istres
Sportspeople from Bouches-du-Rhône